The 1986 Tour du Haut Var was the 18th edition of the Tour du Haut Var cycle race and was held on 22 February 1986. The race started in Seillans and finished in Draguignan. The race was won by Pascal Simon.

General classification

References

1986
1986 in road cycling
1986 in French sport